Aggression Continuum is the tenth studio album by American heavy metal band Fear Factory, released on June 18, 2021. It is the band's first studio album since Genexus (2015), marking the longest gap between two albums in their entire career.

The reasons behind the six-year gap between Genexus and Aggression Continuum were due to creative and personal differences, and legal issues surrounding the band, all of which contributed to Fear Factory going on an extended hiatus and Burton C. Bell leaving the band in 2020 after more than three decades as their singer. Despite this, Bell's vocals are present on the album, as they were recorded in 2017. 

Aggression Continuum also saw Fear Factory's lineup intact for the first time since Transgression (2005), with Mike Heller on drums and founding member Dino Cazares contributing to both guitar and bass.

The album received positive reviews. It was elected by Loudwire as the 33rd best rock/metal album of 2021. The single "Disruptor" was elected by the same publication as the 12th best metal song of the same year.

Track listing

Personnel
 Burton C. Bell – vocals
 Dino Cazares – guitars, bass, arrangements
 Mike Heller – drums

With
 Igor Khoroshev – arrangements, keyboards
 Rhys Fulber – additional keyboards
 Giuseppe Bassi – additional keyboards
 Max Karon – additional keyboards, guitar solo (9)
 Jake Stern – intro narration (1)
 Alex Rise – keyboards outro (10)
 Andy Sneap – mixing and mastering

Charts

References

Fear Factory albums
2021 albums
Nuclear Blast albums